Honcharuk or Goncharuk is a Ukrainian surname. It is derived from the Ukrainian word honchar, "potter", and the suffix -uk, denoting descent. It is also related to Honcharyk, a less common Ukrainian surname.

People 
 Andrii Goncharuk (born 1961), Ukrainian diplomat
 Danylo Honcharuk (born 2002), Ukrainian footballer
 Oleksiy Honcharuk (born 1984), Ukrainian politician
 Pavlo Honcharuk (born 1978), Ukrainian Roman Catholic prelate

Related surnames 
 Honchar
 Honcharenko

See also 
 

Surnames of Ukrainian origin
Ukrainian-language surnames
Occupational surnames